The 1925 New York City mayoral election took place on November 3, 1925, resulting in a victory for Democratic Party candidate Jimmy Walker.

Overview
The main contenders in the race were the Democratic Party candidate Jimmy Walker (1881-1946), a city assemblyman and State Senator, and the Republican candidate Frank D. Waterman (1869-1938) of the Waterman Pen Company. Walker's reputation as a flamboyant man-about-town made him a hero to many working-class voters; he was often seen at legitimate theaters and illegitimate speakeasies. Walker backed many social and cultural issues that were considered politically important at the time, such as opposition to Prohibition, social welfare legislation, legalization of boxing, repeal of blue laws against Sunday baseball games, and condemning the Ku Klux Klan. Waterman was a vocal critic of the Tammany machine's mismanagement of municipal affairs with the expansion of the subway system as a main issue. Waterman, however, was repeatedly accused of hostility to labor, discriminatory hiring practices, and anti-Semitism.

Walker, the Democratic party leader in the New York State Senate received the support from John McCooey, the leader in Brooklyn, and Walker from Ed Flynn of the Bronx, went on to defeat New York Mayor John Hylan in the Democratic primary.

Results
Walker defeated Waterman after receiving 748,687 votes to Waterman's 346,546 votes.

References 

Mayoral election
New York City
1925
New York City mayoral election